was an Imperial Japanese Navy Naval Ace of the Second Sino-Japanese and Second World War.

On December 9, 1937, Kashimura fought Hawk III over Nan- chang, destroying one and then colliding with another aircraft (an unknown type that could have been either Japanese or Chinese), tearing off a third of his left wing. Through superb piloting, the calm aviator brought his crippled Claude' back to base, and after four landing attempts, the aircraft somersaulted on touching the ground on its fourth approach and lost its tail in the subsequent crash. Astoundingly, the pilot walked away from the wreckage unharmed. Local news reporters quickly sent the story back to Japan, where Kashimura gained instant fame.

On March 6, 1943 he was shot down and killed by a US aircraft near the Russell Islands.

References

External links
Kanichi Kashimura - World War II Database
On One Wing

1913 births
1943 deaths
Japanese naval aviators
Imperial Japanese Navy officers
Aviators killed by being shot down
Japanese military personnel killed in World War II
Japanese World War II flying aces